Fish paste is fish which has been chemically broken down by a fermentation process until it reaches the consistency of a soft creamy purée or paste. Alternatively it refers to cooked fish which has been physically broken down by pounding, grinding, pressing, mincing, blending, and/or sieving, until it reaches the consistency of paste. The term can be applied also to shellfish pastes, such as shrimp paste or crab paste.

Fish paste is used as a condiment or seasoning to add flavour to food, or in some cases to complement a dish. Generally, fish paste is reduced to a thick, rich concentrate, which has usually been cooked for a long time. It can be contrasted with fish sauce, which is like a fish paste except it is not cooked for so long, is a thick liquid rather than a concentrated paste, and may include seasonings and other flavorings.



History 
"Preservation of marine products is of great importance to the coastal poor. Preserved fish products ensure adequate protein during low fishing periods. Subsistence fishers use their abundant catch of small fish to make fermented fish paste and smoked fish with the assistance of family members."

Traditional pastes

See also

References

Condiments
Seafood
Food paste